DDB may refer to:

 Dangerous Drugs Board, an agency of the Government of the Philippines
 DDB Worldwide, an advertising agency
 Digital Dictionary of Buddhism
 Dogue de Bordeaux, breed of dog
 Dortmund Data Bank, a factual data bank for thermophysical and thermodynamic data
 DDB, Bitmap graphics or Digidesign Database File, in the Alphabetical list of filename extensions
 DDB, distributed database, is a database in which storage devices are not all attached to a common processor.
 Deutsche Digitale Bibliothek
 D&D Beyond

People
 Daryl Bonilla (born 1975), American actor, comedian and professional wrestler known as "Dangerous" Daryl Bonilla
 Daniel de Bourg, English pop singer